The following is a list of all of the Coptic Orthodox popes who have led the Coptic Orthodox Church and have succeeded the Apostle Mark the Evangelist in the office of Bishop of Alexandria, who founded the Church in the 1st century, and marked the beginning of Christianity in Africa.

The Coptic Orthodox Church is one of the Oriental Orthodox churches (not to be confused with the Byzantine Orthodox group of churches) and is presided over by the Pope and Patriarch of Alexandria who is the body's spiritual leader. This position is held since 2012 by Pope Tawadros II, the 118th Pope of Alexandria and Patriarch of all Africa on the Holy See of St. Mark.

The Oriental Orthodox believe that they are the "one, holy, catholic, and apostolic" Church of the ancient Christian creeds. To this date 92 of the Coptic Popes have been glorified, i.e., canonized as saints, in the Coptic Orthodox Church.

Title "Pope"
The title "pope" (in Greek, Papás) originally was a form of address meaning 'Father' used by several bishops. The first known record of this designation was Heraclas, the 13th Archbishop of Alexandria (232–249). The Alexandrian usage of the honorific does not conflict with the usage in reference to the bishop of Rome.

The full ecclesiastical title is Papa Abba, and the person who bears it stands for the devotion of all monastics, from Pentapolis in the west to Constantinople in the east, to his guidance. Within the denomination, it is the most powerful designation, for all monks in the East to voluntarily follow his spiritual authority, and it is said that it should be assumed that he is a bearer of Christ.

For the Patriarchs of Alexandria prior to the schism after the Council of Chalcedon, see List of Patriarchs of Alexandria. For the patriarchs of the Byzantine Orthodox church after the split with the Oriental Orthodox church, see List of Greek Orthodox Patriarchs of Alexandria.

Note that not all of the dates given are certain. The dates below are according to the Gregorian calendar. Some of the dates disagree with those given in Coptic publications such as The English Katameros. In some cases, publication errors caused the difference and have been corrected. In other cases, calendar differences between the Julian and the Gregorian calendars have caused some confusion.

Dioscorus I served as Patriarch of Alexandria since 444 until he was deposed and exiled by the Council of Chalcedon in 451, but he was still recognized as the Coptic Pope until his death in 454.

Chronological list of popes and patriarchs

1st century

2nd century

3rd century

4th century

5th century

6th century

7th century

8th century

9th century

10th century

11th century

12th century

13th century

14th century

15th century

16th century

17th century

18th century

19th century

20th century

21st century

See also 

 Coptic Orthodox Church
 Coptic Orthodox bishops
 Coptic Orthodox priests

References 
General
 
Specific

External links 
 The Official website of the Coptic Orthodox Pope of Alexandria and Patriarch of All Africa on the Holy See of Saint Mark the Apostle
 Coptic Documents in French

 Popes of Alexandria
Lists of Oriental Orthodox Christians
Coptic Orthodox, Alexandria
Lists of popes, primates, and patriarchs
Egypt religion-related lists
Alexandria-related lists